The turquoise dacnis (Dacnis hartlaubi) is a species of bird in the family Thraupidae. It is endemic to Colombia. It is a rather distinct species of dacnis, formerly separated in the monotypic genus Pseudodacnis.

Its natural habitats are subtropical or tropical moist lowland forest, subtropical or tropical moist montane forest, and plantations. It is threatened by habitat loss.

References

External links
BirdLife Species Factsheet.

Dacnis
Endemic birds of Colombia
Birds described in 1855
Taxa named by Philip Sclater
Taxonomy articles created by Polbot